Saint Peter Island may refer to:

 St Peter Island (South Australia)
 Saint Peter Island (Bulgaria)
 Saint Peter and Saint Paul Archipelago, Brazil
 Saint Peter Islands, Russia

See also
St. Peter's Island, Switzerland
Saint Pierre Island (disambiguation)
San Pietro Island, Italy